Buk or BUK may refer to:

Places

Czech Republic
Buk (Prachatice District), a municipality and village in the South Bohemian Region
Buk (Přerov District), a municipality and village in the Olomouc Region
Buk, a village and part of Jindřichův Hradec in the South Bohemian Region
Buk, a village and part of Milín in the Central Bohemian Region

Poland
Buk, Greater Poland Voivodeship, a town in western Poland
Gmina Buk, the administrative unit
Buk, Podkarpackie Voivodeship, south-east Poland
Buk, Lesser Poland Voivodeship, south Poland
Buk, Goleniów County, West Pomeranian Voivodeship, North-west Poland
Buk, Police County, West Pomeranian Voivodeship, north-west Poland
Buk Góralski, a village in Kuyavian-Pomeranian Voivodeship, mid-northern Poland
Buk Pomorski, a village in Kuyavian-Pomeranian Voivodeship, mid-northern Poland

Other places
Buk, Bulgaria, a village
Buk, Croatia, a village
Bük, a village in Hungary
Būk, a village in Iran
Paranesti, a village in Greece formerly called Buk
Buk District (disambiguation), several districts in South Korea

People
 Choe Buk, Korean painter
 Tadeusz Buk (1960–2010), Polish soldier, Commander of the Polish Land Forces

Other uses
 Buk (drum), a Korean drum

 BES-5, also known as Buk, a Soviet reactor
 Buk missile system, a Soviet and Russian missile system
 Bukawa language, by ISO 639 code
 Bayero University Kano, Nigeria

See also 
 Buk Bak, a Ghanaian musical group